Segezha is a town and the administrative center of Segezhsky District of the Republic of Karelia, Russia, located  north of Petrozavodsk on the Segezha River and on the western shore of Lake Vygozero. Population:

History
It was founded as a railway station on Murmansk Railway in 1915. A small settlement grew around the station; it was granted town status in 1943.  The area around Segezha held many of the early camps within the Soviet gulag system and was known as Segezhlag.

In June 2011, Mikhail Khodorkovsky was moved here to serve his sentence. Russian activist Ildar Dadin writes that he was tortured in this prison in September 2016.

Administrative and municipal status
Within the framework of administrative divisions, Segezha serves as the administrative center of Segezhsky District, to which it is directly subordinated. As a municipal division, the town of Segezha is incorporated within Segezhsky Municipal District as Segezhskoye Urban Settlement.

Economy
Segezha is the location of the Segezha Pulp and Paper Mill, one of the largest pulp and paper companies in Russia.

References

Notes

Sources

Cities and towns in the Republic of Karelia
Segezhsky District
Povenetsky Uyezd